Dustin Bomheuer (born 17 April 1991) is a German professional footballer who plays as a defender. He is currently without a club.

Career
Bomheuer played his first Bundesliga match for MSV Duisburg on 12 August 2012 in a 0–2 away loss against SSV Jahn Regensburg.

He signed a contract with Fortuna Düsseldorf in June 2013.

He returned to Duisburg for the 2015–16 season.

References

External links

1991 births
Living people
German footballers
People from Recklinghausen
Sportspeople from Münster (region)
Association football defenders
SG Wattenscheid 09 players
MSV Duisburg II players
MSV Duisburg players
Fortuna Düsseldorf players
Fortuna Düsseldorf II players
1. FC Magdeburg players
2. Bundesliga players
3. Liga players
Footballers from North Rhine-Westphalia